Stalin's Funeral is a 1990 Soviet drama film written and directed by Yevgeni Yevtushenko. The film stars British actress Vanessa Redgrave.

Plot
1953,  USSR. Moscow bids farewell to Joseph Stalin. In the funeral crowd, Zhenya gets acquainted with Elya. Over the long hours spent in the funeral procession, they become connected to each other until Elya suddenly dies. Afterwards, Zhenya must begin another, adult, life.

Cast
Vanessa Redgrave as English journalist
Denis Konstantinov as Zhenya
  Marina Kalinichenko as Elya
Aleksey Batalov as Zhenya's father
Georgi Yumatov as Stalin's guard
Yevgeni Yevtushenko as Sculptor
Yevgeni Platokhin as Bald
Savva Kulish as Frenchman
 Vsevolod Larionov as Narrator (voice)
Albert Toddle as American
Maya Bulgakova as Stalin's wife 
 Svetlana Kharitonova as Zhenya's aunt
Mikhail Zhigalov as working
Valentin Nikulin as neighbor
 Galina Stakhanova as graveyard worker
 Vladimir Ilyin as   man in a pub
 Sergey Bezrukov (episode)

Production
Yevtushenko's was more critical of Joseph Stalin's crimes by the time of production and he also sought to emphasise his generation's rejection of Stalinism; "If one is to speak about Stalinism, then we are still digging down to the roots of the poisonous tree of totalitarianism, of which Stalin was the gardener. But this film is not about the roots and not about the gardener but rather about the green shoots sprouting in the evil shade of that tree and yet straining toward the light - about our generation."

References

External links
 

1990 films
Soviet drama films
1990s Russian-language films
1990 drama films
Films set in Russia
Films shot in Russia
Fiction set in 1953
Films about the Soviet Union in the Stalin era